Thomas Hartmann or Hartman may refer to:
Thomas de Hartmann (1885–1956), Russian composer and associate of George Ivanovitch Gurdjieff
Thomas Hartmann (biologist) (1937–2017), German  pharmaceutical biologist and ecologist
Thomas W. Hartmann, 2nd Legal Adviser to the Convening Authority in the Department of Defense Office of Military Commissions
Thom Hartmann (born 1951), American broadcaster and author
Thomas Hartman (scientist), faster-than-light theoretician, discoverer of the Hartman effect
Monsignor Tom Hartman, co-host of The God Squad
Tom Hartman, a character on the American soap opera parody Mary Hartman, Mary Hartman
Thomas Hartmann (footballer) (born 1967), Swiss football striker